The Ahaetuliinae are a subfamily of the snake family Colubridae that was erected in 2016 and comprises five genera containing 63 species (Ahaetulla [17 species], Chrysopelea [5 species], Dendrelaphis [45 species], Dryophiops [2 species] and Proahaetulla [1 species]) that are more closely related to one another than to members of the subfamily Colubrinae. Previously placed within Colubrinae, Ahaetuliinae was strongly supported as the sister group to Colubrinae in a 2016 study by Figueroa et al.

Ahaetuliine snakes are arboreal and have keeled ventral and subcaudal scales (laterally notched in some species), and enlarged posterior grooved fangs (lacking in some Dendrelaphis). The name comes from the genus Ahaetulla, which gets its name from the Sri Lankan Sinhalese language words ahaetulla/ahata gulla/as gulla, meaning “eye plucker” or “eye picker”, because of the belief that they pluck out the eyes of humans, as first reported by the Portuguese traveler João Ribeiro in 1685.

Ahaetuliinae are distributed from Pakistan, through India, Sri Lanka, Nepal, and Bangladesh, throughout Southeast Asia into southeastern China, in the Philippines, the Malay Archipelago, Papua New Guinea, and northeastern Australia. Most species are found in forests. Notable traits include gliding in Chrysopelea, jumping behavior in Dendrelaphis, and horizontal keyhole-shaped pupils in Ahaetulla.

Genera
Ahaetulla (17 species)
Chrysopelea (5 species)
Dendrelaphis (46 species)
Dryophiops (2 species)
Proahaetulla (1 species)

References

Alethinophidia